An esplanade or promenade is a long, open, level area, usually next to a river or large body of water, where people may walk. The historical definition of esplanade was a large, open, level area outside fortress or city walls to provide clear fields of fire for the fortress's guns. In modern usage, the space allows the area to be paved as a pedestrian walk; esplanades are often on sea fronts and allow walking whatever the state of the tide, without having to walk on the beach.

History
In the 19th century, the razing of city fortifications and the relocation of port facilities made it possible in many cities to create promenade paths on the former fortresses and ramparts. The parts of the former fortifications, such as hills, viewpoints, ditches, waterways and lakes have now been included in these promenades, making them popular excursion destinations as well as the location of cultural institutions. The rapid development of artificial street lighting in the 19th century also enabled safe use in the evening. One example of this is Vienna's Ringstrasse.

Esplanades became popular in Victorian times, when it was fashionable to visit seaside resorts. A promenade, often abbreviated to '(the) prom', was an area where people – couples and families especially – would go to walk for a while in order to 'be seen' and be considered part of 'society'. Beach promenades such as the Promenade de la Croisette in Cannes, the famous Promenade des Anglais on the Mediterranean coast in Nice or the Lungomare of Barcola in Trieste still play a central role in city life and in the real estate market.

In the United States, esplanade has another meaning, being also a median (strip of raised land) or berm dividing a roadway or boulevard. Sometimes they are just strips of grass, or some may have gardens and trees. Some roadway esplanades may be used as parks with a walking/jogging trail and benches.

Esplanade and promenade are sometimes used interchangeably. The derivation of "promenade" indicates a place specifically intended for walking, though many modern promenades and esplanades also allow bicycles and other nonmotorized transport. Some esplanades also include large boulevards or avenues where cars are permitted.

Examples

Asia

India 
 Esplanade, also known as the Central Business District in Kolkata
 Kamarajar Salai, Chennai in Chennai
 Marine Drive, Kochi in Kochi
 Marine Drive in Mumbai
 Bandstand Promenade in Mumbai
 Promenade Beach in Pondicherry

Malaysia 
 Esplanade, George Town, Penang
 Gurney Drive, George Town, Penang
 Karpal Singh Drive, George Town, Penang

Philippines 
 Baywalk, Manila
 Dipolog Boulevard, Dipolog
 Rizal Boulevard Promenade, Dumaguete
 Iloilo River Esplanade, Iloilo City
 Bai Walk, Cotabato City
Paseo del Mar, Zamboanga City
Mandulog River Esplanade, Iligan City

Others 
 Tsim Sha Tsui East, Victoria Harbour in Hong Kong
 West Kowloon Waterfront Promenade , West Kowloon Cultural District in Hong Kong
 Tel Aviv Promenade, Tel Aviv, Israel
 Corniche Beirut, Beirut, Lebanon
 The Esplanade, Singapore
 Galle Face Green, Colombo, Sri Lanka
 Breakwater Corniche or Al-Kasr in Abu Dhabi, United Arab Emirates
 Doha Corniche, Doha, Qatar
 The Bund, Shanghai, China

Americas and Caribbean

United States 
 The Camelback Esplanade, Phoenix, Arizona
 The Charles River Esplanade, Boston, Massachusetts
 The Eastern Promenade, Portland, Maine
 The Esplanade, Redondo Beach, California
 The Esplanade, Rio del Mar, California
 Third Street Promenade, Santa Monica, Los Angeles County, California
Eastbank Esplanade, Portland, Oregon
The East River Greenway, New York, New York

Others 
 Calçadão de Copacabana and Calçadão de Ipanema, Rio de Janeiro, Brazil
 Malecón, Puerto Vallarta, Mexico
 Malecón, Havana, Cuba
 Rambla de Montevideo, Uruguay
 Terrasse Dufferin, Quebec City, Canada
 Esplanade, Sydney, Nova Scotia, Canada

Europe 
 Barcola, Trieste, Italy
 Esplanade, Redcar, England
 Esplanade, Exmouth, England
 Esplanade, East Cowes, Isle of Wight, England
 Esplanade, Aberdeen, Scotland
 (The) Esplanade, Lerwick, Scotland 
 Esplanaden, Copenhagen, Denmark
 La Promenade des Anglais, in Nice, France
 Esplanade de La Defense, France
 Paseo Marítimo de Pontevedra, in Pontevedra, Spain
 Usedom Beach Promenade, Western Pomerania, Germany (Europe's longest beach promenade)
 Riga, Esplanade, Latvia
 Świnoujście, by the Baltic Sea, Poland
 Trzebież, by the Szczecin Lagoon, Poland
 The Esplanade, in Weymouth, England
 The Promenade, at Portobello, in Edinburgh, Scotland
 Esplanadi, in Helsinki, Finland
 Valletta Waterfront, in Floriana, Malta
 Spianada, in Corfu town, Greece
 Salthill Promenade, in Galway, Ireland

Others 
 St Clair Esplanade in Dunedin, New Zealand
 Marine Parade, in Napier, New Zealand
 The Golden Mile, Durban, South Africa
 Sea Point, Cape Town, South Africa

Inland

 Esplanade of the European Parliament, in Brussels, Belgium
 Ministries Esplanade, in Brasília, Brazil
 The Esplanade (Toronto), in Toronto, Canada
 Thames Embankment, in London, England
 Brühl's Terrace, Dresden, Germany
 The Danube Promenade in Budapest, Hungary
 Esplanade, in Calcutta, India
 Iloilo River Esplanade in Iloilo City, Philippines
 Błonia, Kraków, Poland
 L'Enfant Plaza in Washington, D.C., United States
 Charles River Reservation, in Boston, Massachusetts, United States
 The Eastbank Esplanade, in Portland, Oregon, United States

Gallery

See also
 Boardwalk
 Foreshoreway
 Malecón
 Oceanway
 Processional walkway
 Similar areas inland: Boulevard, mall

References

Types of streets
Waterfronts
Greenways